Pristova is a village in the Municipality of Dobrna in Slovenia. It lies on the right bank of Dobrnica Creek, south of Dobrna, extending south into the Hudinja Hills. The area is part of the traditional region of Styria. The municipality is now included in the Savinja Statistical Region.

References

External links
Pristova on Geopedia

Populated places in the Municipality of Dobrna